FC Slovácká Slavia Uherské Hradiště was a Czech football club from the town of Uherské Hradiště, which played one season in the Czech First League. It was founded in 1894.

Uherské Hradiště won promotion to the country's top flight, the Czech First League, after finishing first in the 1994–95 Czech 2. Liga. The club subsequently featured in the 1995–96 Czech First League, under the name of FC JOKO Slovácká Slavia Uherské Hradiště, finishing bottom of the league and winning only three of their thirty matches. The club dropped out of the second league after winning just twice in the 1997–98 Czech 2. Liga. In 2000 the club was merged with FC Synot from the town of Staré Město, becoming 1. FC Synot.

History in domestic competitions

 Seasons spent at Level 1 of the football league system: 1
 Seasons spent at Level 2 of the football league system: 3
 Seasons spent at Level 3 of the football league system: 2
 Seasons spent at Level 4 of the football league system: 1

Czech Republic

Honours
Czech 2. Liga (second tier)
 Winners 1994–95
Moravian–Silesian Football League (third tier)
 Winners 1993–94

References

Defunct football clubs in the Czech Republic
Association football clubs established in 1894
Association football clubs disestablished in 2000
Czech First League clubs
1894 establishments in Austria-Hungary
2000 disestablishments in the Czech Republic
Sport in Uherské Hradiště